Vojislav Stanimirović may refer to:

 Vojislav Stanimirović (politician) (born 1953), Croatian politician of Serbian descent
 Vojislav Stanimirović (criminal) (born 1937), Serbian American journalist and high-profile thief